Sławkowice  is a village in the administrative district of Gmina Biskupice, within Wieliczka County, Lesser Poland Voivodeship, in southern Poland.

Famous people 
 Stanisław Lubomirski (d. 1585) was a Polish nobleman (szlachcic) and owner of the Sławkowice and Zabłocie estates.

References

Villages in Wieliczka County